The 1998 Major League Soccer season was the third season of Major League Soccer. It was also the 86th season of FIFA-sanctioned soccer in the United States, and the 20th with a national first-division league. The Chicago Fire and Miami Fusion played their inaugural seasons as the first two MLS expansion teams. Chicago would become the first expansion team to win the MLS Cup and the first to win it in its inaugural year.

Stadiums and locations

Standings

Eastern Conference

Western Conference

Overall Table

MLS Cup Playoffs

Bracket
The ties were a best of three series.

Conference semifinals

Eastern Conference

D.C. United advance 2–0, to the Conference Finals.

Columbus Crew advance 2–0, to the Conference Finals.

Western Conference

Los Angeles Galaxy advance 2–0, to the Conference Finals.

Chicago Fire advance 2–0, to the Conference Finals.

Conference finals

Eastern Conference

D.C. United advance 2–1, to MLS Cup

Western Conference

Chicago Fire advance 2–0, to MLS Cup

MLS Cup

Chicago Fire and D.C. United qualified for the 1999 CONCACAF Champions' Cup.

Player awards

Weekly award

Monthly awards

End of year awards

Player statistics

Top goal scorers

Attendance

International Competition 

CONCACAF Champions' Cup

 D.C. UnitedDefeat  Joe Public F.C. 8–0 in quarterfinals.Defeat  Deportivo Saprissa 2-0 in semifinals.Defeat  Toluca 1–0 in final.
 Colorado RapidsLose  Club León 4–3 on aggregate in qualifying round.

Interamerican Cup

 D.C. UnitedDefeat  Vasco da Gama 2–1 on aggregate.

First leg played at RFK StadiumSecond leg played at Lockhart Stadium.

Coaches

Eastern Conference
D.C. United: Bruce Arena
New York/New Jersey MetroStars: Carlos Alberto Parreira

Western Conference
Dallas Burn: Dave Dir
Kansas City Wiz: Ron Newman
San Jose Clash: Brian Quinn

References
MLS Site

 
1998 in American soccer leagues
Major League Soccer seasons